Kyanga may be:

Kyanga language
Kasaloo Kyanga, Congolese musician, guitarist, and composer